The 1931 Macdonald Brier, the Canadian men's national curling championship, was held from March 3 to 5, 1931 at the Granite Club in Toronto, Ontario.

Team Manitoba, skipped by Bob Gourley, captured the Brier Tankard with a round robin record of 8-1. This was Manitoba's fourth consecutive Brier championship. A tiebreaker game was played to determine the runner-up as both Ontario and Toronto finished the round robin with 6-3 records. Ontario defeated Toronto in an extra end 13-12 to finish runner-up.

This was the last Brier to feature Montreal and Toronto as their own teams.

The 1931 Brier was one of only two Briers (the other being ) to feature no ends that were blanked. This Brier also set the record at the time for the most extra ends played in a single Brier with six (five in the round robin plus the runner-up tiebreaker playoff).

Teams
The teams are listed as follows:

Round Robin standings

Round Robin results

Draw 1

Draw 2

Draw 3

Draw 4

Draw 5

Draw 6

Draw 7

Draw 8

Draw 9

Tiebreaker

References 

Macdonald Brier, 1931
Macdonald Brier, 1931
The Brier
Curling in Toronto
Macdonald Brier
Macdonald Brier
1930s in Toronto